The following lists events that happened during 1862 in Australia.

Incumbents

Governors
Governors of the Australian colonies:
Governor of New South Wales – John Young, 1st Baron Lisgar
Governor of Queensland – Sir George Bowen
Governor of South Australia – Sir Richard G. MacDonnell, Sir Dominick Daly
Governor of Tasmania – Colonel Thomas Browne
Governor of Victoria – Sir Henry Barkly.
Governor of Western Australia – Sir Arthur Kennedy, then Dr John Hampton.

Premiers
Premiers of the Australian colonies:
Premier of New South Wales – Charles Cowper
Premier of Queensland – Robert Herbert
Premier of South Australia – Thomas Reynolds, then George Waterhouse
Premier of Tasmania – Thomas Chapman
Premier of Victoria – John O'Shanassy

Exploration and settlement
 24 July – Explorer John McDouall Stuart successfully returns from crossing the Australian continent from north to south on his third attempt.

Music, arts and literature
 Waterfall, Strath Creek – Eugene von Guérard

Sport
 4 November – Archer wins the second Melbourne Cup (List of Melbourne Cup winners).

Births

 18 January – William Higgs, Queensland politician (d. 1951)
 4 February – George Ernest Morrison, journalist and geologist (d. 1920)
 24 March – John Clemons, Tasmanian politician and lawyer (d. 1944)
 29 July – Mona McBurney, pianist, teacher and composer (born in the United Kingdom) (d. 1932)
 29 August – Andrew Fisher, 5th Prime Minister of Australia (born in the United Kingdom) (d. 1928)
 25 September – Billy Hughes, 7th Prime Minister of Australia (born in the United Kingdom) (d. 1952)
 16 November – Charles Turner, cricketer (d. 1944)
 8 December – Kate Rickards, trapeze artist and musical theatre actress (d. 1922)

Deaths

 13 March – Roderick Flanagan, historian, poet, and journalist (born in Ireland) (b. 1828)

References

 
Australia
Years of the 19th century in Australia